Genet or Genêt is a French surname. Notable people with this surname include the following:

 Alexis Genet (born 1982), French footballer
 Edmond Genet (1896-1917), American aviator
 Edmond-Charles Genêt or Citizen Genêt (1763–1834) French envoy to the United States appointed by the Girondins during the French Revolution
 Guy Genet (born 1955), French footballer
 Henry W. Genet (1828–1889), New York politician
 Jean Genet (1910–1986), French writer
 Joseph Genet (1914–1999), New Zealand wrestler
 Jean-Philippe Genet (born 1944), French historian
 Ray Genet or Pirate (1931–1979), Alaskan mountaineer
 Russell Merle Genet (born 1940), American astronomer

French-language surnames